Marcus Atilius  Regulus may refer to the following consuls of Rome in the third century BC:

 Marcus Atilius Regulus (consul 294 BC), first man from the gens Atilia to become consul of Rome.
 Marcus Atilius Regulus (consul 267 BC) (died 250 BC), son of the above, consul whose overconfidence led him into defeat and captivity in Carthage
 Marcus Atilius Regulus (consul 227 BC), apparently elder surviving son of the captured consul and grandson of the first Marcus Atilius, consul in 227 BC and consul suffect in 217 BC